Inhibitor of growth protein 2 is a protein that in humans is encoded by the ING2 gene.

Function 

This gene is a member of the inhibitor of growth (ING) family. Members of the ING family associate with and modulate the activity of histone acetyltransferase (HAT) and histone deacetylase (HDAC) complexes and function in DNA repair and apoptosis.

References

Further reading

External links 
 

Transcription factors